Helcystogramma convolvuli, the sweet potato moth, sweetpotato webworm moth, sweetpotato leaf roller or black leaf folder, is a moth of the family Gelechiidae. It is mainly found in Asia and Africa, but there are also records from Oceania, the Middle East, the Caribbean and Florida in the United States. The species is also found on the Canary Islands and Madeira.

The wingspan is 13–15 mm. The forewings are dark tawny fuscous. The hindwings are brownish grey.

The larvae feed on Convolvulaceae species, including Ipomoea batatas, Convolvulus arvensis, Merremia quinquefolia, Ipomoea aquatica, Ipomoea cairica and  Ipomoea alba. First instar larvae create a tunnel of silk along the leaf vein and feeds underneath on the surface tissue. The second instar larvae move to the upper leaf surface and fold the leaf, feeding within the fold until the green tissues are consumed, when it moves to another leaf.

References

Moths described in 1908
convolvuli
Cosmopolitan moths